Gohar was a class of patrol boat that was built in the West Germany for the Imperial Iranian Navy. Three vessels in the class (named Gohar, Shahpar and Shahram) were delivered to Iran by Abeking & Rasmussen between 1969 and 1971. In 1975, Iran transferred the boats to Sudan, where they were respectively renamed to Skeikan (or Shekan), Kadir (or Kader) and  Karari.

See also 
 List of naval ship classes of Iran

References 

Ships of the Imperial Iranian Navy
Ships built in Germany
Patrol boat classes